The 2006 European Individual Speedway Junior Championship was the ninth edition of the Championship.

Qualification
Qualification Round:

 Togliatii
Qualification Round:

 Elgane
Semi-Final:

 Debrecen
Semi-Final:

 Ostrów Wielkopolski

Final
August 19, 2006
 Goričan

Heat details
 de Jong, Karpov, Šitera, Hougaard (w)
 L.Hansen, Pavlič, Jędrzejewski (u), K.Hansen (w)
 Wolbert, Szczepaniak, Dąbrowski, Kůs
 Jakobsen, Kling, Gomólski, Stichauer (d)
 Jakobsen, L.Hansen, de Jong, Kůs
 Pavlič, Kling, Wolbert, Karpov (d)
 Šitera, Stichauer, Szczepaniak, Jędrzejewski (w)
 Gomólski, K.Hansen, Hougaard, Dąbrowski
 Pavlič, Gomólski, de Jong, Szczepaniak (u)
 Karpov, L.Hansen, Dąbrowski, Stichauer (w)
 Kling, Kůs, Šitera, K.Hansen (u)
 Jędrzejewski, Wolbert, Hougaard, Jakobsen
 Jędrzejewski, de Jong, Kling, Dąbrowski
 Karpov, Jakobsen, K.Hansen, Szczepaniak
 Gomólski, Šitera, L.Hansen, Wolbert (w)
 Pavlič, Kůs, Hougaard, Stichauer
 K.Hansen, de Jong, Stichauer, Wolbert
 Karpov, Jędrzejewski, Kůs, Gomólski
 Pavlič, Dąbrowski, Šitera, Jakobsen
 Szczepaniak, L.Hansen, Kling, Hougaard

References

2006
European I J